Benson Young Parkinson (born 1960) is a Latter-day Saint novelist, literary critic, and biographer. He has published two novels concerning fictional LDS missionaries, entitled The MTC: Set Apart and Into the Field, as well as a biography of S. Dilworth Young, an LDS general authority. In the mid-1990s he became involved in the Association for Mormon Letters (AML), primarily by creating an email forum for the discussion of LDS literature called AML-List, for which he was awarded the 2000 AML Award for Criticism. Parkinson then co-founded the literary journal Irreantum and served as co-editor for a year. His criticism of LDS literature has been featured in multiple publications. He is a graduate of Brigham Young University.

Personal life
Parkinson was born in Provo, Utah. He served a mission for the Church of Jesus Christ of Latter-day Saints in France. In 1985 he graduated from Brigham Young University with a degree in Comparative Literature. He and his wife Robin are the parents of five children and live in Ogden, Utah.

Career

Writing 
Parkinson's novel The MTC: Set Apart was published by Aspen Books in 1995. It follows four new LDS missionaries as they enter the Missionary Training Center. Robert M. Hogge praised the "rich language, symbolism, ... and allusion" present in The MTC, but writer Brian Evensen called the novel's characters stereotypical and the dialogue "hackneyed and predictable." Parkinson continued the missionaries' story with 2000's Into the Field, which follows the four young men as they travel to France. In a review in Irreantum, Neal Kramer commended the realistic nature of the novel, saying: "I wondered whether I was reading a novel or a memoir. I had to shake myself a little to remember I was reading LDS fiction." Parkinson has also published a biography of his grandfather S. Dilworth Young, a member of the Quorum of the Seventy, entitled S. Dilworth Young: General Authority, Scouter, Poet. The author presented this work at the AML's symposium that year. In a review for the Journal of Mormon History, Gary Huxford called the biography "a good read that deserves a wide audience," citing Parkinson's inexperience as a biographer as both a strength and a weakness to the work overall. In 1996, Parkinson hosted a session at the Fourth Annual LDS Writers Conference entitled "How to Sell Your LDS Novel."

In addition to full-length books, Parkinson has written reviews and articles about Latter-day Saint fiction, many of which have been published in issues of Irreantum. The 1998 edition of AML Annual featured his essay "Electric Talk: Twenty Months of AML-List." "The Deseret School and the Missionary School," Parkinson's take on the different approaches to LDS writing, was published in the first volume of Irreantum in 1999. In addition to publishing such essays, Parkinson worked as an editor for the Church Educational System in the early 2000s.

The Association for Mormon Letters 
Beginning in the mid-1990s, Parkinson was an active participant in the Association for Mormon Letters (AML). In 1995, he created AML-List, an email forum for the discussion of LDS literature sponsored by the association. He also served as moderator until the year 2000. The forum received an average of 30 posts per day, which included reviews of various LDS films and books. Over time, AML-List received more than 1000 entries from users. Parkinson wanted to facilitate an energetic environment that would allow people with different interests to share their opinions. During this time, he also worked on AML-List Magazine, which showcased authors' works online. Parkinson won the 2000 AML Award for Criticism for his work on AML-List: including establishing the forum, moderating it, editing thousands of posts, and creating regular columns of literary news and reviews.

Then, in 1999, he co-founded the literary magazine Irreantum with Chris Bigelow. The publication featured some content first produced on AML-List as well as "original fiction, poetry, essays, reviews, interviews, and literary news." Parkinson and Bigelow were Irreantum's first co-editors, with Parkinson serving as the first reader of submissions and collaborator with the editing staff. Similar to his goal of inclusivity for AML-List, Parkinson wanted the magazine "to give broad coverage and support to every sort of Mormon literature and to promote all kinds." During this time he also served as an ex officio board member of the AML. He ended his time as co-editor after the Summer 2000 issue.

Bibliography

Novels
 The MTC: Set Apart (1995)
 Into the Field (2000)

Short Stories
 "Wesley's Carol" in Once Upon a Christmastime: Short Stories for the Season (1997)

Biographies
 S. Dilworth Young: General Authority, Scouter, Poet (1994)

Criticism
 "Toward an LDS Aesthetic of the Novel: A Report from the Front Lines" (1997)
 "Three Kinds of Appropriateness" in Irreantum, vol. 2 (2000)
 "The Deseret School and the Missionary School" in Irreantum, vol. 1 (1999)

References 

1960 births
Writers from Provo, Utah
Writers from Ogden, Utah
Latter Day Saints from Utah
Brigham Young University alumni
Living people
20th-century Mormon missionaries
American Mormon missionaries in France
20th-century American novelists
American male novelists
Novelists from Utah
Richards–Young family
20th-century American male writers